5 @Home sometimes 5 at Home is a Ugandan drama television series starring Raymond Rushabiro, Tumusiime Nicole, Jovan Lugave, Alen Komujuni and Arinaitwe Ramadhan that premiered on Fox Life in July 2017.

Plot
Henry Muwonge, the patriarch of the modern African Muwonge family loses his government job after national elections and is forced to downgrade his family. It's hard for the family members to get used to living on a limited budget.

Production and release
The series is a production of Fasttrack Productions. It was initially meant for NTV but production was halted for years citing production costs. It was first released on YouTube on 14 July 2015 and later picked up by Fox Life.

See also
The Life (2012 Film)
Yat Madit
Deception NTV
Balikoowa in the City
The Hostel
Beneath The Lies

References

Ugandan drama television series
2015 Ugandan television series debuts
2010s Ugandan television series
Pearl Magic original programming